Sergei Korolev was a Ukrainian Soviet rocket engineer.

Sergei Korolev may also refer to:

People 
 Sergei Alexandrovich Korolev (1874–1932), a Russian microbiologist who founded industrial microbiology
 Sergei Borisovich Korolev (1962–), a Russian intelligence officer who serves as deputy director of the FSB

Other uses 
 Soviet ship Akademik Sergey Korolev, a Soviet tracking ship

See also 
 Korolyov (disambiguation)